The WCWA World Six-Man Tag Team Championship was a professional wrestling championship promoted by the  promoted by the Dallas–Fort Worth metroplex area-based World Class Wrestling Association (WCWA) from 1982 until 1988. The company was known as World Class Championship Wrestling (WCCW) in 1982 as they introduced the WCWA World Six-Man Tag Team Championship, on occasion billed as the NWA World Six-Man Tag Team Championship (Texas version). As it is a professional wrestling championship, it is won not by actual competition, but by a scripted ending to a match.

The first champions were The Fabulous Freebirds (Michael Hayes, Terry Gordy and Buddy Roberts), who won the championship on December 25, 1982 as part of WCCW's annual Christmas Star Wars show. For storyline purposes David Von Erich actually substituted for Buddy Roberts in the match, citing "travel difficulties". After winning the match Von Erich gave the belt to Buddy Roberts, which was part of a building storyline feud between the Freebird and The Von Erichs. The Von Erich/Freebird storyline feud played a major part in the history of the championship as various combinations of Freebirds and Von Erichs were involved in 17 of the 19 reigns. Michael Hayes, Kevin Von Erich and Kerry Von Erich were the last team to hold the championship as it was abandoned in 1988.

The Freebird combination of Hayes, Roberts and Gordy held the championship a total of five times, the most of any trio. Kevin Von Erich held the championship 11 times with various partners including his father Fritz Von Erich, brothers Kerry, David and Mike Von Erich, as well as Michael Hayes, Brian Adias, Chris Adams, Steve Simpson and Lance Von Erich. The longest individual reign lasted 282 days as Kevin, Mike and Lance held the title from July 4, 1986 to April 12, 1987. The Freebirds' five reigns combined to at least 581 days, the longest combined of any team. Fritz, Kevin and Mike Von Erich held the championship for a matter of hours, as Fritz gave his third of the championship to Kerry Von Erich at the end of the show where they won it.

Title history

Team reigns by combined length
Key

Individual reigns by combined length
Key

Footnotes

References

Trios wrestling tag team championships
World Class Championship Wrestling championships